Aleksey Dmitriyenko (born 4 December 1976) is a Kazakhstani gymnast. He competed at the 1996 Summer Olympics.

References

External links
 

1976 births
Living people
People from North Kazakhstan Region
Kazakhstani male artistic gymnasts
Olympic gymnasts of Kazakhstan
Gymnasts at the 1996 Summer Olympics
Asian Games medalists in gymnastics
Gymnasts at the 1998 Asian Games
Asian Games silver medalists for Kazakhstan
Medalists at the 1998 Asian Games
20th-century Kazakhstani people